In physical oceanography, the significant wave height (SWH, HTSGW or Hs) 
is defined traditionally as the mean wave height (trough to crest) of the highest third of the waves (H1/3). Nowadays it is usually defined as four times the standard deviation of the surface elevation – or equivalently as four times the square root of the zeroth-order moment (area) of the wave spectrum. The symbol Hm0 is usually used for that latter definition. The significant wave height (Hs) may thus refer to Hm0 or H1/3; the difference in magnitude between the two definitions is only a few percent.
SWH is used to characterize sea state, including winds and swell.

Origin and definition
The original definition resulted from work by the oceanographer Walter Munk during World War II. The significant wave height was intended to mathematically express the height estimated by a "trained observer".  It is commonly used as a measure of the height of ocean waves.

Time domain definition
Significant wave height H1/3, or Hs or Hsig, as determined in the time domain, directly from the time series of the surface elevation, is defined as the average height of that one-third of the N measured waves having the greatest heights:  where Hm represents the individual wave heights, sorted into descending order of height as m increases from 1 to N. Only the highest one-third is used, since this corresponds best with visual observations of experienced mariners, whose vision apparently focuses on the higher waves.

Frequency domain definition
Significant wave height Hm0, defined in the frequency domain, is used both for measured and forecasted wave variance spectra. Most easily, it is defined in terms of the variance m0 or standard deviation ση of the surface elevation:  where m0, the zeroth-moment of the variance spectrum, is obtained by integration of the variance spectrum. In case of a measurement, the standard deviation ση is the easiest and most accurate statistic to be used.
Another wave-height statistic in common usage is the root-mean-square (or RMS) wave height Hrms, defined as:  with Hm again denoting the individual wave heights in a certain time series.

Statistical distribution of the heights of individual waves

Significant wave height, scientifically represented as Hs or Hsig, is an important parameter for the statistical distribution of ocean waves. The most common waves are lower in height than Hs. This implies that encountering the significant wave is not too frequent. However, statistically, it is possible to encounter a wave that is much higher than the significant wave.

Generally, the statistical distribution of the individual wave heights is well approximated by a Rayleigh distribution.

 1 in 10 will be larger than 
 1 in 100 will be larger than 
 1 in 1000 will be larger than 

This implies that one might encounter a wave that is roughly double the significant wave height. However, in rapidly changing conditions, the disparity between the significant wave height and the largest individual waves might be even larger.

Other statistics
Other statistical measures of the wave height are also widely used. The RMS wave height, which is defined as square root of the average of the squares of all wave heights, is approximately equal to Hs divided by 1.4.

For example, according to the Irish Marine Institute:
"… at midnight on 9/12/2007 a record significant wave height was recorded of 17.2m at with [sic] a period of 14 seconds."

Measurement
Although most measuring devices estimate the significant wave height from a wave spectrum, satellite radar altimeters are unique in measuring directly the significant wave height thanks to the different time of return from wave crests and troughs within the area illuminated by the radar. The maximum ever measured wave height from a satellite is 20.1m during a North Atlantic storm in 2011.

Weather forecasts

The World Meteorological Organization stipulates that certain countries are responsible for providing weather forecasts for the world's oceans. These respective countries' meteorological offices are called Regional Specialized Meteorological Centers, or RSMCs. In their weather products, they give ocean wave height forecasts in significant wave height. In the United States, NOAA's National Weather Service is the RSMC for a portion of the North Atlantic, and a portion of the North Pacific. The Ocean Prediction Center and the Tropical Prediction Center's Tropical Analysis and Forecast Branch (TAFB) issue these forecasts.

RSMCs use wind-wave models as tools to help predict the sea conditions. In the U.S., NOAA's WAVEWATCH III(R) model is used heavily.

Generalization to wave systems
A significant wave height is also defined similarly, from the wave spectrum, for the different systems that make up the sea. We then have a significant wave height for the wind-sea or for a particular swell.

See also 
 Ocean Prediction Center
 Rogue wave: a wave of over twice the significant wave height
 Sea state

Notes

External links 
Current global map of significant wave height and period
NOAA WAVEWATCH III(R)
NWS Environmental Modeling Center
Envirtech solid state payload for directional waves measurement

Naval architecture
Physical oceanography
Shipbuilding
Water waves